Thomas Greenway Stockham (December 22, 1933 – January 6, 2004) was an American scientist who developed one of the first practical digital audio recording systems, and pioneered techniques for digital audio recording and processing. He also led the development of the Digital Audio Tape (DAT) system.

Life and career
Stockham was born in Passaic, New Jersey. Stockham attended Montclair Kimberley Academy, graduating in the class of 1951. Known as the "father of digital recording", he earned an Sc.D. degree from the Massachusetts Institute of Technology in 1959 and was appointed Assistant Professor of Electrical Engineering. Early in his academic career at MIT, Stockham worked closely with Amar Bose, founder of Bose Corporation, on  the use of digital computers for measurement and simulation of room acoustics and for audio recording and enhancement. While at MIT, he noticed several of the students using an MIT Lincoln Laboratory TX-0 mainframe computer installed at the campus to record their voices digitally into the computer's memory, using a microphone and a loudspeaker connected to an A/D-D/A converter attached to the TX-0. This expensive tape recorder led Stockham to his own digital audio experiments on this same computer in 1962.

In 1968, he left MIT for the University of Utah, and in 1975, founded Soundstream, Inc. The company developed a 16-bit digital audio recording system using a 16-track Honeywell instrumentation tape recorder as a transport, connected to digital audio recording and playback hardware of Stockham's design. It ran at a sampling rate of 50 kHz, as opposed to the audio CD sampling rate of 44.1 kHz.

Soundstream Inc. was the first commercial digital recording company in the United States, located in Salt Lake City. Stockham was the first to make a commercial digital recording, using his own Soundstream recorder in 1976 at the Santa Fe Opera. In 1980, Soundstream merged with the Digital Recording Company (DRC) and became DRC/Soundstream.

Stockham played a key role in the digital restoration of Enrico Caruso recordings, described in a 1975 IEEE paper. These acoustic recordings were the first to be digitally restored by computer, and were released on the album Caruso - A Legendary Performer, issued in 1976 by RCA Records.

Watergate investigation
In 1974, he investigated President Richard Nixon's White House tapes, alongside fellow members of the panel of persons nominated jointly by the White House and the Special Prosecution Force. It was he who discovered that the 18 minutes of erasures were not accidental, as Nixon's secretary Rosemary Woods claimed.  Stockham was able to discern several distinct erasures and even determined the order of erasure.

Stockham's team reached agreement on seven conclusions detailed in their 87-page report to Chief Judge John J. Sirica:

Development of audio technology
Stockham led the development of the Digital Audio Tape (DAT) format, a user-recordable digital tape that was popular for a time in the 1990s. The continually lowering price of compact discs led to DAT being used only in certain roles, and its last major manufacturer, Sony, phased out development starting in 2005.

Stockham received wide recognition for his pioneering contributions to digital audio. He received, among many others, the Gold Medal award from the Audio Engineering Society in 1987, a Technical Emmy award in 1988, the Poniatoff Gold Medal from the Society of Motion Picture and Television Engineers, a Grammy award from NARAS in 1994, the IEEE Jack S. Kilby Signal Processing Medal in 1998 and a Scientific and Engineering award from the Academy of Motion Picture Arts and Sciences in 1999.

References

External links
 
 
 
 
 An article on Soundstream and the introduction of commercial digital recording in the United States

1933 births
2004 deaths
MIT School of Engineering alumni
Montclair Kimberley Academy alumni
People from Passaic, New Jersey
University of Utah faculty
Grammy Award winners
Emmy Award winners